The 1989 U.S. Men's Clay Court Championships was a Grand Prix men's tennis tournament held in Charleston, South Carolina in the United States. It was the 21st edition of the tournament and was held from May 8 to May 15, 1989. Sixth-seeded Jay Berger won the singles title.

Finals

Singles

 Jay Berger defeated  Lawson Duncan 6–4, 6–3
 It was Berger's only title of the year and the 4th of his career.

Doubles

 Mikael Pernfors /  Tobias Svantesson defeated  Agustín Moreno /  Jaime Yzaga 6–4, 4–6, 7–5
 It was Pernfors's only title of the year and the 3rd of his career. It was Svantesson's 1st title of the year and the 1st of his career.

References

External links 
Association of Tennis Professionals (ATP) – tournament profile